Shane Reeves is an American businessman, pharmacist and politician who is the State Senator for the 14th District of Tennessee, which is composed of Bedford County, Moore County, Lincoln County, Marshall County, and part of Rutherford County. Reeves campaigned as a conservative Republican in the Tennessee State Senate District 14 Special Election in 2018. The special election was mandated because of a vacant seat created by Jim Tracy's acceptance of Tennessee Director for Rural Development with the Trump Administration. Jim Tracy endorsed Shane Reeves. Prior to entering politics, Reeves co-owned Reeves-Sain Drug Store in Murfreesboro, TN, and after selling in 2015, he founded Twelvestone Health Partners in 2016.

Early life and career 
Reeves was born in Murfreesboro, TN, to Carolyn Reeves, a school teacher, and Richard Reeves, a small business man, city councilman and former mayor of Murfreesboro. Reeves graduated from Oakland High School  and attended Middle Tennessee State University where he graduated with a Bachelor of Science in 1990. He began Pharmacy School at the University of Tennessee Memphis and graduated in 1994. He returned to his hometown, and in 1995, Reeves and Rick Sain bought Reeves-Powell Drug Store from Richard Reeves and Ron Powell. The business was renamed Reeves-Sain Drug Store and closed in December 2018. Reeves and Sain sold the company in 2015. In 2016, Reeves founded Twelvestone Health Partners.

Personal life 
Reeves lives in Murfreesboro, TN, with his wife, Amanda, and their three children, Will, Jack, and Emma-White. He is a deacon at North Blvd. Church of Christ.

Political career 
Reeves announced his campaign for the Tennessee State Senate District 14 Special Election on November 7, 2017. Jim Tracy endorsed Reeves November 8, 2017. Reeves won the primary election against Joe Carr, with 64.87% of the vote. In March 2018, Reeves defeated Democrat Gayle Jordan in the general election, with 71.72% of the vote. Since taking office, Reeves has joined the Senate Government Operations Committee, the Senate Judiciary Committee, and has been elected Chaplain for the 111th General Assembly. In January 2019, Reeves was appointed Vice-Chairman of the Senate Health and Welfare Committee, joined the State and Local Government Committee, and the Energy Committee. The Tennessee General Assembly has a full list of Reeves' Sponsored and Co-Sponsored Bills and Resolutions on its website.

Political Beliefs and Values 
Reeves has conservative values, he believes in freedom of religion and the freedom to bear arms given in the second amendment. He is pro-life and supports the lowering of taxes, and he is against excessive regulation and illegal immigrants. He wants to combat the Opioid epidemic, child abuse, and human trafficking in Tennessee. Because of his past, Reeves believes that he is "uniquely suited to bring conservative solutions to the healthcare crisis as a pharmacist and successful healthcare business owner." Reeves also believes in the importance of education, as he supported all of the bills that were also supported by Tennesseans for Student Success in 2019.

Social media 
Reeves often talks about current situations and bills that he is in support of on social media. He is active on Twitter, Instagram, and Facebook.

References 

People from Murfreesboro, Tennessee
Republican Party Tennessee state senators
Middle Tennessee State University alumni
University of Tennessee Health Science Center alumni
Living people
21st-century American politicians
1968 births